Four ships of the French Navy have been named in honour of Armand-Jean du Plessis, Cardinal Richelieu, considered to be one of the founders of the French Navy.

Ships 
  (1873), a central battery ironclad.
  (1915), an auxiliary patrol boat.
  (1939), a fast battleship.
  was originally to have been named Richelieu.
 French aircraft carrier PA2 (now cancelled) would potentially have been named Richelieu.

Notes and references

Notes

References

Bibliography 
 

French Navy ship names
Cardinal Richelieu